Potito Starace is the defending champion. Starace lost in the final against Simone Bolelli 6–7(7–9), 2–6.

Seeds

Draw

Finals

Top half

Bottom half

References
Main Draw
Qualifying Singles

Sporting Challenger - Singles
Sporting Challenger